Senator Heath may refer to:

Bill Heath (politician) (born 1959), Georgia State Senate
Charles H. Heath (1829–1889), Vermont State Senate
Rollie Heath (born 1937), Colorado State Senate
William Heath (1737–1814), Massachusetts State Senate